Szczebrzeszyn is a city in southeastern Poland in Lublin Voivodeship, in Zamość County, about 20km west of Zamość. From 1975–1999, it was part of the Zamość Voivodeship administrative district. The town serves as the seat to the Gmina Szczebrzeszyn district. A 2004 census counted 5,357 inhabitants. It lends its name to the Szczebrzeszyn Landscape Park. Szczebrzeszyn is often called the "Capital City of Polish Language".

History

Early history 
Szczebrzeszyn's history can be traced back to 1352, during the reign of Casimir III, although archaeological evidence suggests the area had been settled for several centuries prior to this. Neighboring villages named in Nestor's 11th century chronicle of Rus further support that Szczebrzeszyn is much older, once lying beside a major commercial route running from south to north.

By 1492, trade had developed enough to warrant a special act imposed by Jan Olbracht. The Act specified which roads Szczebrzeszyn merchants could use when traveling through Lesser Poland with their wares. As merchants traveled through Szczebrzeszyn, they paid set taxes which proved to be an excellent source of revenue. For example, the tax on a wagon with merchandise was 2 groschen, on an ox: 1 groschen, and on a wagon with salt from Drohobycz: a measure of salt.

After Jan Amor Tarnowski of Tarnów's death in 1500, Szczebrzeszyn stayed in the hands of the Tarnowski family for the next 20 years. Later it was included in a dowry to the Kmita family. At that time, long-running feuds among family members re-ignited over the Szczebrzeszyn inheritance, while other magnates laid claims at this time. King Zygmunt August issued a binding decree to end this dispute in 1555, which allocated rights over the city to the Gorka family of Greater Poland.

The Gorkas took a strong interest in religious matters, and granted freedom to all religious groups. They built a Greek Orthodox church, transformed the Roman Catholic parish church into a Calvinist one, and opened a synagogue nearby. Well-known supporters of the Reformation from Szczebrzeszyn, Stankar and Felix Kreutziger, sought the protection of these feudal lords. During this time, Szczebrzeszyn reached the highest levels of development.

Rise and fall 

A variety of reasons led to the halting of development and, later, a steep decline. In early September, 1583, a fire swept through the castle keep, which destroyed all of the documents relating to privileges granted by Andrzej Gorka. These privileges were quickly renewed by the reigning king, Stefan Batory. The Gorkas also confirmed and expanded the Magdeburg Laws, which benefited the citizens.

The last of the Gorkas, Stanislaw, died in 1592, after which the Szczebrzeszyn estates were taken over by the Czarnkowski family. In 1593, Jan Zamoyski purchased Szczebrzeszyn, along with 35 surrounding villages, and integrated them into his Ordinate. Zamoyski founded a new capital city in his Zamość estates, and it was at this point that Szczebrzeszyn lost its significance and the decline began.

Despite the focus on Zamość, Zamoyski funded the Monastery of the Holy Franciscans and next to it the Cloister of the Holy Trinity, the modern-day Cloister of Saint Katarzyna. Apart from this, he liquidated the Catholic church and returned the one-time parish cloister to the Catholics.

During the 17th century, religious animosity increased, and a 1637 decree issued by Tomasz Zamoyski resulted in the expulsion of the Arians. The city was also assaulted by the Tatars, Turks, and Cossacks. In particular, the city was torched and plundered by Tatars in 1672. A multitude of epidemics decimated the population and victims of the Plague were taken to a separate cemetery outside of the city. At the time of the partition of Poland, Szczebrzeszyn had fallen into the hands of Austria.

New development 
The beginning of the 19th century saw a renewed interest in Szczebrzeszyn. With Zamość no longer functioning as the seat to the Zamoyski estates, the family transferred several functions to the city. The relocation of the provincial school and Holy Mercy Hospital stimulated growth and new buildings were constructed to accommodate the increasing population. The Chief Physician was moved here, and a hospital treating peasants for venereal diseases also opened.

Education became an important part of life in Szczebrzeszyn. The district school was under the direct oversight of Stanisław Zamoyski who recruited both talented teachers and students. Lady Teofilia Reder opened a private school for girls that taught many advanced subjects. Due to the strength of the schools and the direction of Stanisław Zamoyski, Szczebrzeszyn suffered less from the politics of Russification than other settlements did after the November Uprising. For this precise reason, Russian authorities disbanded the provincial school in 1852.

During the uprising 

Pedagogue Wincenty Dawid wrote in his 1887 memoir about the November Uprising:

"In the end, our tranquillity and working lives were disrupted and the model order of the Szczebrzeszyn schools was wrecked. The news, that an uprising had broken out in Warsaw, and that the Russians had abandoned the capital city, and also the borders of the kingdom, elicited an unheard of exhilaration among everyone. The quiet shtetl, which knew of no other politics other than making appeals to the nobility, immediately felt demands to step out into the political arena together with the entire land.

"In the course of one hour, the black eagles on top of the Magistrate Building were torn down and smashed, as well as from other institutions. The old swords were unearthed, and pistols, they were cleaned off, and made ready. In the smithies, the blacksmiths worked even on holidays. Agricultural implements were beaten into pikes. Scythes were mounted on long poles.

"The intelligentsia, the professors and the Rector himself, call the youth to arm themselves. A rededication of the flag was celebrated, praying in the courtyard of the school. The Rector, Zenkowski gave a speech to the lined up rows of citizens and students, armed with all sorts of ammunition, that each individual was able to make for himself. At the end of the ceremonies, 'Jeszcze Polska nie zginela' was sung. This took place in the middle of December, and immediately, Prof. Kowalski, and many older students, went off with Zenkowski to the Polish military. Only a small number of students remained in the school, only children.

"After Christmas, a movement of the Russian military began. The first to enter Szczebrzeszyn were the Dragoons, whose wild, beard-covered physiognomies made a frightful impression on us. We looked with fear upon these huge men, who camped out on the same place where the battle-ready youth had stood.

"Immediately, news reached us about the decisive battles between the Polish military and its heroic leaders in the field, from Grochów, behind Wawer. Every bit of news was transmitted with great fervor from hand-to-hand, comments were made, and plans were made for the future, as is usual in a small shtetl. The joy became even greater in the spring, when our military [forces] entered Lithuania with Dembinski and Gieldung at their head, when [Wojciech] Chrzanowski and [Jozef] Dwernicki entered the Lublin region, marching on Wolhyn, on the second side of the Bug River, stopping along the way to conduct general battles outside of Czaczki, and Old-Zamość.

"On the same Schulhof, on that great Thursday, Dwernicki's Uhlans and the Krakusi billeted themselves, placing several cannons around the place, which it seems to me had been plundered from Czaczki. We spiritedly approached our riders, and played with their weaponry. For several days, food and drink was carried to them from the city. They were accepted as brothers.

"When the spring and summer heat set in, a cholera epidemic spread through the city here for the first time. Horse manure was burned in the marketplace and in the streets as a remedy against the cholera, but it didn't help. Many families left the city for the surrounding forests. Prayers were offered in the cloisters to end the epidemic, or prayers of thanksgiving for those victories from the arresting of the disease. The young priest Nowakowski, a fiery orator, would tell the worshippers after prayers about the heroic deeds of our leaders. He punished and accused those young people, who withheld themselves from the military, calling each of them by their name...

"Zamość, the nearby fortress, and other points, were threatened with encirclement. Many clashes took place in Szczebrzeszyn. The Cossacks would fall upon the city, plundered, beat the Jews, and the townsfolk. A minute later, the Uhlans or the Krakusi would arrive from the direction of Zamość. Once, the Cossacks, as a response to such an attack, decided to take revenge on the city, while the youth of the city took part in these clashed between the Polish military and the Cossacks. At night, the Cossacks drew near in order to torch the city and carry out a slaughter among its residents. A tumult arose in the city, and half the city's residents fled to the nearby forests. One could already hear the shooting from the direction of Janów.

"However confusion elicits wonder. The aggressive people armed themselves. The municipal policeman, an older military man, together with the sexton of the cloister, raised an alarm. Banging on the cloister drum, they gave orders in a loud voice, and in doing so, gave the impression that there was a large military detachment present. The Cossacks and Dragoons, which were already positioned outside the city, decided to pull back. Later orders restrained them from acts of vengeance."

When a national liberation movement developed before the January Uprising in 1863, the greatest reaction in the entire Zamość Powiat occurred in Szczebrzeszyn. For years afterward, local residents were arrested under suspicion for being a part of the uprising.

Russification methods 

After the failure of the Uprising, the Russian authorities began to implement a severe policy of Russification, supplanting things which were not Russian. Elderly people were asked to record their recollections of that time, but as the majority were illiterate, younger literate townspeople often had to transcribe oral recollections of their elders. The war interrupted these efforts.

The persecution of the Uniates was dramatic. An elderly peasant from Zurawnica told of a frightful scene, when one of his neighbors, a Uniate, agreed to accept the Russian Orthodox faith. The protests of his wife had no effect. Everything was arranged, all the formalities settled, but when the peasant was about to begin the communion ceremony, his wife went mad from mental confusion, and attacked the priest. This had a fearful effect on her husband, who refused to complete the ceremony. Being much taken by these tales, effort was made to assemble details about the Uniates in Szczebrzeszyn. A notice from the year 1843 announces that the parish of the Uniates was very poor, because it had 'a small number of adherents to the Szczebrzeszyn church (tserkva).' In December 1877, the priest, Aleksander Górski—who, it appears, did not belong to the resistance fighters—signed his letter as the 'Rector of the Szczebrzeszyn Orthodox Parish.' It was at that time that the Uniates and the Greek Catholic Church were liquidated, and was transformed into a Russian Orthodox church.

Later on, the priest Timofei Tracz came as Rector, and a sorrowful era was initiated for the Polish Catholics, particularly the Uniates. Although the Rector himself was once a Uniate priest, he voluntarily converted to the Russian Orthodox church and became an ideological Russifier and disseminator of his new faith. He led an ascetic existence, and his activities had a fanatical character. Over time, he became extremely influential as he became known to the highest institutional authorities.

Everyone in the Zamość region feared him. He met with little resistance in his efforts to spread the Russian Orthodox faith, and he used any method necessary: promises, chicanery, threats, and violence.

Documents in the Zwierzyniec archives confirm that there never were any Russian Orthodox faithful residing year-round in Szczebrzeszyn, with the exception of officials, who would sometime spend time here. Apart from the Russian Orthodox church, which had been transformed, as previously mentioned, from a Greek-Catholic church, the Catholic Church near the hospital was remade as a Russian Orthodox church in 1883. The number of adherents to the Russian Orthodox parish grew quickly in proportion, and in that time totaled 486 individuals.

In the year 1905, in the first two months after the publication of the Tolerance Manifesto, 4,195 people in the Szczebrzeszyn parish converted from Russian Orthodoxy to the Roman Catholic faith, and 402 people from the outskirts of Zamość. The Tolerance Declaration was a severe blow to Tracz, as it undid all his efforts. He resisted the desertion, but to no avail; his health was damaged and he died in 1909.

During World War I, the Muscovites left Szczebrzeszyn and both Orthodox churches were locked down. The entire Russian Orthodox parish appeared to disappear; townspeople even changed the spelling on the grave stones of their kin, from Russian to Polish, in order to erase all traces of their former church affiliations. Even Tracz's gravesite and memorial were eradicated. In accordance with an order from the bailiff, someone during the night broke down the monument, and Trascz's coffin was transferred from the churchyard to the public cemetery.

The Rector of the Roman Catholic parish was at that time the priest, Grabarski. He was very popular, and known for his philanthropic activities—even for the benefit of Jews. He was very much beloved by the Jews. For many years, prayers were offered in synagogues on his behalf.

Life in Szczebrzeszyn during the time of the Russian rule was miserable. The pressure of rule was felt heavily from the side of the Russian authorities. Community activity was minimal: there was no manner of spiritual movement. Despite this, a certain amount of conspiratorial activity did continue, such as illegal study. Certain organizations did exist: Mlodziez Szkolna, N.D., P.P.S.

The external character of Szczebrzeszyn was set down by the military; a Cossack battalion was stationed in the town. When World War I, military marched through the shtetl: Russian, Austrian, Russians again, and later a long time of Austrian occupation. Many forms of orientation manifested themselves: pro-Moscow, pro-Austrian, initiatives for independence. Part of the young people went off to military legions.

The Holocaust 
Between 3,000 and 4,000 Jews lived in Szczebrzeszyn when the German Army occupied the city in 1939. Isaac Bashevis Singer's grandmother, Tema Blima Szejner, was from the city. Singer mentions his grandmother Tema in his autobiographical novel 'In My Father's Court'. On October 14, 1939—in spite of the fact it was the Jewish Sabbath—the Germans ordered the Jews to clean the streets for the entire day. They treated them brutally by cutting or tearing off their beards, cursing them, and beating them. In mid-October, a police force was formed in Szczebrzeszyn—composed of 60 men—and was instructed to persecute the Jewish population of the city.

Several hundred Jews from Kalisz and Wloclawek were re-settled in Szczebrzeszyn. The Judenrat was forced to provide several dozen men for work in Zamość each day. According to a Polish doctor in the town, Zygmunt Klukowski: "The Jewish laborers are sent to Bortatycze and Bialobrzeg outside of Zamosc. The work consists of digging ditches in order to drain the swamps there. They must work standing in the water. They sleep in barracks that are incredibly dirty. They must make this trip (to the labor camp) every day, and if they make the slightest mistake, they are beaten with clubs. The Jewish slave laborers are covered with lice. They are mostly boys, 17–20 years old."

On November 10, 1942, Klukowski wrote: "In principle, all the Jews in the settlements of the Bilgoraj district, to which Szczebreszyn belongs, have been killed. The only ones remaining are those in the forests, valleys, etc." In total, there were six separate transports from Szczebrzeszyn to Bełżec extermination camp between May and November 1942—totaling more than 5,500 Jewish men, women and children to their immediate deaths.  Hundreds of other Jews were murdered in Szczebrzeszyn, hunted down by police and Polish civilians and then murdered.  One Polish couple did shelter a Jewish family and were named Righteous Among the Nations by Yad Vashem after the war. The once vibrant Jewish community of Szczebrzeszyn ceased to exist.

After the Zamość Uprising 
In July the Polish resistance carried out the country-wide Operation Tempest, and in the Zamość region the town of Szczebrzeszyn and Zamość itself were freed by the partisans.

In literature 
The name Szczebrzeszyn is infamous for being very difficult to pronounce for non-native speakers. Polish poet, Jan Brzechwa used the town's name in his poem entitled Chrząszcz. The line with Szczebrzeszyn goes like this:
W Szczebrzeszynie chrząszcz brzmi w trzcinie (pronunciation)

This roughly translates to: "In [the town of] Szczebrzeszyn a beetle sounds in the reed". The phrase has been incorporated in everyday language as an epitome of Polish tongue twisters, and is often presented by natives to foreign learners of Polish. A monument depicting a cricket playing the violin that was erected in Szczebrzeszyn refers to the poem.

In 2004 Philip Bibel (1909–2006), brother of painter Leon Bibel, published his Tales of the Shtetl, a memoir of early 20th century life in the shtetl of Szczebrzeszyn. Sample chapters can be read here: 
Our Shabbos in Shebreshin
Noise, Music, and Klezmer
The Last Jew

People 
Józef Brandt (1841–1915),  painter, born in Szczebrzeszyn
Leon Bibel (1913–1995), painter,  born in Szczebrzeszyn
Meir ben Samuel of Shcherbreshin (17th century), poet of Szczebrzeszyn
Kazimierz Kelles-Krauz (1872–1905), philosopher, sociologist, born in Szczebrzeszyn
Zygmunt Klukowski (1885–1959), physician, bibliophile and historian, lived in Szczebrzeszyn

Gallery

References 
 History of Szczebrzeszyn by Zygmunt Klukowski (from Shebreshin Yizkor Book), Translation: Jackob Salomon Berger
 Tomasz Panczyk's Szczebrzeszyn Website

External links

Szczebrzeszyn-Shebreshin Website
Szczebrzeszyn.pl Website
Szczebrzeszyn.info Website
Szczebrzeszyn Online Website
Jewish History of Szczebrzeszyn
History and description of Szczebrzeszyn from 1890

Cities and towns in Lublin Voivodeship
Zamość County
Ruthenian Voivodeship
Kholm Governorate
Lublin Voivodeship (1919–1939)
Tongue-twisters